Bahorok or Bohorok is a district of Langkat Regency. Its capital is Bohorok town, and Bukit Lawang is a major local tourist attraction for viewing orangutans.

The Bohorok river, which is a tributary of the Wampu River, joins the Wampu in the district.

History
According to legend, a Karo of marga Peranginangin, submarga Sukatendel was hunting and found a child in some bamboo. The child was given to a childless woman to raise. The area where the child was found eventually became Kuta Buluh. When that child grew older, he married a woman of Sukatendel village.

He had five children, the middle being Dewa Perangin-angin. Dewa Perangin-angin converted to Islam, in order to marry Paga Ruyung of Deli Tua.

They had three children, Sutan Jabar, Sutan Husin and Putri Hijau. Sutan Husin was in a dispute with his brother, Sultan Jabar, so Slutan Jabar went to Malacca, while Sutan Husin following the Wampu river upstream, and stopped to rest where it met another river (the Bohorok). Eventually he built a house at this point. One day, while on a hunting trip, he climbed the hill from the river, and finding an unknown sweet-tasting fruit tree at the top named it Buah Huruk (or fruit that is atop the hill in Karo language).

Bohorok had previously been called Tanjung by the Malays as it was the meeting point of the two rivers.

Bohorok was involved in trade along the Wampu river, buying salt at Pangkalan Brandan from the Kampar Malays there. Tengku Tan Deraman, son of Tengku Djukdin, son of Tengku Panji Sakar, son of Tengku Syahmardan, son of Sutan Husin, was the first to promote the cultivation of land for farming.

The lineage of Bahorok kingdom, from the 16th century is said to be:
 Raja Sutan Husin
 Tengku Syahmardan bin Sutan Husin
 Tengku Panji Sakar bin Tengku Syahmardan
 Tengku Djukdin bin Panji Sakar
 Tengku Tan Deraman bin Tengku Djukdin
 Tengku Basir bin Tengku Djukdin, he fled in 1835 to Kutacane from the Dutch, and was replaced by
 Tengku Tan Perang bin Tengku Djukdin
 Tengku Lengkong son of Tengku Tan Perang
 Tengku Hasyim, founder of Bohorok mosque (1917), died 27 May 1935
 Tengku Bahagi, younger brother of Tengku Hasyim
 Tengku Saidi Husni, son-in-law of Tengku Hasyim
 Tengku Sembab, until Indonesian independence in 1945

Thus Bahorok is a historically Malay-Karo kingdom.

The kingdoms of Bohorok, Stabat and Binjai eventually united to form the kingdom of Langkat, which became Langkat Regency under Dutch rule, and also later under Indonesian rule.

Name change
The name of Bahorok district was officially changed from Bohorok in 1987, due to a forging of the official stamp of Bohorok. Other government departments still use the name Bohorok.

Details
To the south lies Karo Regency, to the west Southeast Aceh province, to the east Salapian district, and to the north Batang Serangan district.

There are 22 desa and luruh within Bahorok district:
 Batu Jong Jong, comprising 479 square km, larger than the other 21 desa combined.
 Lau Damak
 Sampe Raya
 Perkebunan Bungara
 Pekan Bahorok (the only kelurahan)
 Empus
 Perkebunan Turangi
 Simpang Pulau Rambung
 Sematar
 Perkebunan Pulau Rambung
 Suka Rakyati
 Tanjung Lenggang
 Sumber Jaya
 Perkebunan Sei Musam
 Amal Tani
 Bukit Lawang
 Timbang Lawan
 Timbang Jaya
 Sebertung
 Pulau Semikat
 Sei Musam Kendit
 Musam Pembangunan

The district is mostly Muslim (88%), with 11% Protestant, and negligible others. There are above-average Christian populations in Batu Jong Jong (33%), Lau Damak (30%), Sampe Raya (23%), Sei Musam Kendit (20%), Pekan Bahorok (16%), Simp. Pulau Rambung (13%). There are 65 mosques, 45 mushollas and 13 churches in the area.

In most desa, Javanese are the largest group, with the exception of Lau Damak (Karo), Timbang Lawan, Timbang Jaya, Pekan Bahorok, Tanjung Lenggang, and Empus (Malay).

There are 40 junior schools, 10 middle schools, and 3 high schools (SMA Negeri 1 Bohorok, plus two private schools). There are also 17 (of which 16 private) junior madrasahs, 6 (of which 5 private) middle school madrasahs, and 2 senior school madrasahs (both private).

Notable agricultural production includes wet rice fields (sawah), maize and cassava. There are only cottage industries in the district.

While there is a surfaced road to Medan, other roads tend to be unsurfaced or dirt tracks.

References

Langkat Regency